Khurutshe is a village in Kgatleng District of Botswana. The village is located 100 km north of Mochudi, and it has a primary school. The population was 35 in 2001 census.

References

Kgatleng District
Villages in Botswana